Celestino Pinto (born 11 August 1931) was a Brazilian boxer. He competed at the 1952 Summer Olympics and the 1956 Summer Olympics.

References

External links
 

1931 births
Possibly living people
Light-welterweight boxers
Brazilian male boxers
Olympic boxers of Brazil
Boxers at the 1952 Summer Olympics
Boxers at the 1956 Summer Olympics
Pan American Games bronze medalists for Brazil
Pan American Games medalists in boxing
Boxers at the 1955 Pan American Games
Sportspeople from Rio de Janeiro (city)
Medalists at the 1955 Pan American Games
20th-century Brazilian people
21st-century Brazilian people